Theta Alpha Phi National Theatre Honors Fraternity is an American honor society that accepts members who achieve excellence in the art of theatre. Membership is available to undergraduates and graduate students at member institutions.

The History of Theta Alpha Phi 
Since the dissolution of the National Collegiate Players/Pi Epsilon Delta National Theatre Honor Society, Theta Alpha Phi is the oldest honor society for theatre in the United States. Other theater honor societies include Alpha Psi Omega and Delta Psi Omega, the latter designated for 2-year schools.

Theta Alpha Phi National Theatre Honors Fraternity is an honors society rather than a recognition association or activity club. It confers nationally recognized honors on graduate and undergraduate students who earn a specified high level of quality in theatre study and production at over 30 selected, accredited colleges and universities. 
     
Theta Alpha Phi is restricted to four-year or graduate colleges and universities on a highly selective basis. It has no junior college branches or subsidiaries, and admits to membership only students of sophomore standing or above. Students become eligible after having successfully met a prescribed minimum of experience in directing, writing, acting in, or managing plays.

Theta Alpha Phi is the only independent theatre honors organization with standards and functions established solely by its own constitution without regard to requirements of other organizations. It is not a member of any association whose member societies are concerned with areas other than theatre, but which nevertheless control the standards and hence the functions of members. Theta Alpha Phi is the only national organization which honors graduate and undergraduate students for quality as well as quantity of work and study in theatre arts alone. Unlike some organizations which demand that students achieve a certain level in all studies, most of which are unrelated to theatre, Theta Alpha Phi demands excellence only in theatre. Hence, Theta Alpha Phi believes a student can be outstanding in theatre and deserving of honor in theatre without comparable achievement in all areas of study.

Theta Alpha Phi is democratic in organization. There is no secrecy, no "blackball," and no chapter or member discrimination on the basis of race, color or creed. The constitution, initiation ceremony, financial statements, and other records are available for inspection to any responsible person or organization. Throughout its history, Theta Alpha Phi has retained a consistent and dynamic "fraternalist" policy of mutual aid among members and member schools.

Symbols and traditions 
The fraternity explains that pronunciation of its name can be either "Thay-ta Al-fa Fye" or "Thay-ta Al-fa Fee".  The latter is closer to the original Greek pronunciation.

The official colors of Theta Alpha Phi are Purple and White.

The gold badge of the Fraternity displays prominently a form of "Sock and buskin", more commonly known as the Comedy and Tragedy masks, long associated with the theatrical arts.

The motto of Theta Alpha Phi is "The purpose of playing is [...] to hold, as 'twere, the mirror up to nature" (a reference to the "advice to the players" speech in Hamlet).

Members are referred to as "Thetas," "Thetans," "TAPs," or "Taffies."

Theta Alpha Phi presents a national award called the Medallion of Honor, which it purports is the highest national tribute made in educational theatre.

Theta Alpha Phi's magazine, The Cue, was established in 1922 and is oriented distinctly and solely to students of theatre in higher education. With articles, pictures and other features relevant to mature college students rather than to younger readers or faculty. The Cue provides a useful and important service not only to members, but to all students of theatre.

Chapters 
Chapter information from the national website, or Baird's Manual (20th, reprinted from the 19th ed.) Active chapters noted in bold, inactive chapters noted in italics.

Approximately 50 dormant chapters are not listed, which may be re-activated with faculty sponsorship.

National Officers 
National President - Kathleen DeVault (Ohio Northern University) 2017-Current

Notable members

References

External links 
 
 Archival materials related to Theta Alpha Phi, in the L. Tom Perry Special Collections, Harold B. Lee Library, Brigham Young University

Honor societies
Theatrical organizations in the United States
Student organizations established in 1919
1919 establishments in Oklahoma